The men's 60 metres at the 2016 IAAF World Indoor Championships took place on March 18, 2016.

Asafa Powell has spent a career where he was (until the advent of Usain Bolt), the fastest man in the world, but championships have evaded him.  In the opening heats, most athletes try to get to the next round without fully extending themselves.  Powell ran his opening heat in 6.44, just .05 off the world record, making him the fifth-fastest athlete in history.  More impressive, he noticeably eased up ten meters away from the finish line.  It was the Jamaican National Record and the world leading time for 2016.  In the semi-final round, Powell repeated the performance with exactly the same time.  In the final, that speed wasn't there, instead Trayvon Bromell led from the first step out of the blocks and nobody could catch him.  After getting a poor start, Powell made a late rush to capture the silver, still his best individual medal at the world level, edging out Ramon Gittens' national record for bronze.

Results

Heats
Qualification: First 3 (Q) and next 3 fastest (q) qualified for the semifinals.

Semifinals
Qualification: First 2 (Q) and next 2 fastest (q) qualified for the final.

Final
The final was started at 20:40.

References

60 metres
60 metres at the World Athletics Indoor Championships